Wopko Pieter Jensa (born 26 July 1939 in Ventersdorp, South Africa), is a South African poet and artist. Jensma published three collections of poetry before his disappearance in 1993.

Background
Jensma's art is ethnic, based on a theme unique to himself, lino-printed images of animals drawn as characteristics of people. His poetry was characterized as having a jazzlike feel to it; he described his words as his jazz instrument and his expression being his rhythm.

Sing for our Execution (1973)
Where White is the Colour/Where Black is the Number (1974)
I Must Show you my Clippings (1977)

A selection of Jensma's poems appeared, with a brief biography, in the anthology Ten South African Poets edited and introduced by Adam Schwartzman (Manchester: Carcanet Press, 1999). There is an online appreciation of Jensma's poetry and art works, with quotations and some biographical details, by Tony McGregor entitled I write you from afar: Wopko Jensma, enigmatic poet of Africa.

Disappearance
Jensma disappeared from Johannesburg without a trace in August 1993, and has not been seen since. No information of what became of him is known.

See also
List of people who disappeared

References

External links
Art archives Wopko Jensma
(Contains a number of further external links)

1939 births
1990s missing person cases
20th-century South African male writers
20th-century South African poets
Artists from Cape Town
Missing people
Missing person cases in Africa
South African male poets
Writers from Cape Town